The First Wescot-Williams cabinet was the first Cabinet of Sint Maarten installed following the achievement of constituent country status of Sint Maarten within the Kingdom of the Netherlands on 10 October 2010. Government formation followed the September 2010 Sint Maarten general election, which saw the National Alliance emerge as the largest party. Nevertheless, the coalition was formed by the Democratic Party and the United Peoples party. Despite only winning two seats, the office of Prime Minister was delivered by DP's head Sarah Wescot-Williams.

The coalition collapsed in April 2012 after United Peoples faction leader Romain Laville left his party and became an independent member of parliament. The cabinet lost its majority and tabled its resignation with the governor. The cabinet was succeeded by the second Wescot-Williams cabinet on 21 May 2012.

Composition
The cabinet was composed as follows:

|Prime Minister
|Sarah Wescot-Williams
|DP
|10 October 2010
|-
|Deputy Prime Minister and Minister of Housing, Physical Planning, and Environment
|Theodore Heyliger
|UP
|10 October 2010
|-
|Minister of Finance
|Hiro Shigemoto
|UP
|10 October 2010
|-
|Minister of Justice
|Roland Duncan
|UP
|10 October 2010
|-
|Minister of Tourism, Economic Affairs, Transport and Telecommunications
|Franklin Meyers
|UP
|10 October 2010
|-
|rowspan="3"|Minister of Healthcare, Social Development, and Labor
|Maria Buncamper-Molanus
|DP
|10 October 2010
|-
|Sarah Wescot-Williams (interim)
|DP
|23 December 2010
|-
|Cornelius de Weever
|DP
|10 March 2011
|-
|Minister of Education, Culture, Youth, and Sports
|Rhoda Arrindell
|UP
|10 October 2010
|-
|Minister Plenipotentiary of Sint Maarten
|Mathias Voges
|DP
|10 October 2010
|}

References

Wescot-Williams I
2010 establishments in Sint Maarten
2012 disestablishments in Sint Maarten
Cabinets established in 2010
Cabinets disestablished in 2012